Lactista gibbosus, the trailside grasshopper, is a species of band-winged grasshopper in the family Acrididae.

References

External links

 

Oedipodinae